Rear-Admiral George Tobin (13 December 1768 – 10 April 1838) was an English Royal Navy officer and artist.

Early life
The second son of James Tobin of Nevis in the West Indies, and his wife Elizabeth Webbe, he was elder brother of John Tobin and James Webbe Tobin. He was born in England at Salisbury on 13 December 1768, and studied at King Edward VI School, Southampton. He entered the navy in 1780 on board , in which he later went out to the West Indies, being present at the Battle of the Saintes during April 1782.

From 1788 to 1790 he made a voyage in Sulivan, a ship of the East India Company. On his return he was for a few weeks on board  during the Nootka Crisis, and on 22 November he was made a lieutenant.

Lieutenant
He kept an illustrated journal, covering in particular Tahiti and Tasmania. It is now in the State Library of New South Wales.

He was instead appointed second lieutenant of the frigate , captain Alexander Cochrane, which he considered a better outcome. Nelson, however, regretted it, writing of Tobin, on 12 July 1797, "The time is past for doing anything for him. Had he been with me, he would long since have been a captain, and I should have liked it, as being most exceedingly pleased with him."

Captain
Tobin was made a commander on 12 July 1798. It was the flagship of his old chief Cochrane, off Ferrol and then in the West Indies. In September 1805 Tobin was moved into HMS Princess Charlotte, a 38-gun frigate, and in her, off Tobago, captured the French corvette Cyane.

After much convoy service Tobin, still in the same frigate, renamed HMS Andromache in 1812, co-operated during 1813–14 with the army in Peninsular War operations in the north of Spain and the west of France. In July 1814 Andromache was paid off, and Tobin had no further service at sea.

Retirement and death
On 8 December 1815 Tobin was nominated a C.B. He became a rear-admiral on 10 January 1837, and died at Teignmouth on 10 April 1838.

Family
Tobin married, in 1804, Dorothy, daughter of Captain Gordon Skelly of the navy, widow of Major William Duff of the 26th Regiment. They had one son and one daughter.

References

External links

1768 births
1838 deaths
Royal Navy officers
English artists
People from Salisbury
Companions of the Order of the Bath